Polish Cognitive Linguistics Association (PCLA) is a non-profit science organization that sponsors conferences and publications in the field of  Cognitive linguistics and is an affiliate of International Cognitive Linguistics Association.

In 2015 PCLA had 97 members representing various Polish and international academic institutions. Among the honorary members of PCLA is Ronald Langacker, one of the pioneers of cognitive linguistics.

References

External links 
 PCLA home page
 PCLA conference, UMCS Lublin University 2015
 PCLA conference, AJD Czestochowa University 2014
 PCLA conference, University of Wroclaw 2012

Cognition
Cognitive linguistics